The Hampshire is a pub at 227 King Street, Hammersmith, London.

The Hampshire, formerly The Hampshire Hog was first licensed in the 17th century as The Hogs, a name based on that of the members of the Royal Hampshire Regiment. The current building was owned by Sich's Chiswick Brewery, and they rebuilt it in 1883. The road running along the west side is Hampshire Hog Lane, and 17th century Hampshire House and Hampshire Cottage, both since demolished, were close by.

Before the take over of The Hampshire Hog in 2012, the owners had previously run the Engineer in Primrose Hill, one of the first gastropubs in London. They continued this legacy through The Hampshire Hog and ran it as a gastropub. In July 2020, the pub was rebranded as an Indian Restaurant under the updated name 'The Hampshire'.

References

Pubs in the London Borough of Hammersmith and Fulham
Hammersmith
Restaurants in London